Mascha Geurts (born December 9, 1973 in Nijmegen, Gelderland) is a retired water polo goalkeeper from the Netherlands. She made her debut for the Women's National Team in 2001, and was on the squad that won the competed at the 2001 World Championship in Fukuoka, Japan. 

Geurts competed for her native country at the 2001 European Championship in Budapest, Hungary, finishing in fifth place. Her biggest success came in 2002, when the Dutch were finalist in the six-nations tournament in Monte-Rotondo, Italy. She currently plays with ENC-Arnhem. They recently promoted to the Dutch 1st class (minor league).

References
  Dutch Olympic Committee

1973 births
Living people
Dutch female water polo players
Sportspeople from Nijmegen